Eric Walter Orbom (July 6, 1915 – May 23, 1959) was an American art director. He won a posthumous Academy Award in the category Best Art Direction for the film Spartacus.

Biography
He was born on July 6, 1915, in Stockholm, Sweden to Walter Eric Gustav Orbom (1890–1915) and Signe Albertina Jonsson (1891–1961). He migrated to the United States in 1918 and lived in Salt Lake City, Utah. He died on May 23, 1959, in Los Angeles, California.

Selected filmography
 Spartacus (1960)

References

External links

1915 births
1959 deaths
American art directors
Best Art Direction Academy Award winners